Manager of the Month may refer to:

English football
Premier League Manager of the Month
Football League Championship Manager of the Month
Football League One Manager of the Month
Football League Two Manager of the Month
Football League First Division Manager of the Month
Football League Second Division Manager of the Month
Football League Third Division Manager of the Month

Scottish football
List of Scottish Premier League monthly award winners
Scottish Football League monthly awards, including those for manager

Irish football
League of Ireland Premier Division Manager of the Month

Spanish football
La Liga Manager of the Month
Segunda División Manager of the Month